In the classic era of the cinema of the United States (1930 – 1945) genres matured. Short time periods with a large amount of films consisting of a specific genre are known as "cycles". While most would recognize many of the genres as Westerns, gangsters, musicals, etc., often the cycles were significantly more specific.  Instead of "romantic comedy", a cycle might be described as the "Boy-meets-girl-boy-loses-girl-boy-gets-girl" cycle.

See also
 Film theory
 Film genre
 Formula fiction In literary works, generic storylines are referred to as formula fiction.

Film production